Colla coelestis is a moth in the Bombycidae family. It was described by Schaus in 1910. It is found in Costa Rica.

References

Natural History Museum Lepidoptera generic names catalog

Bombycidae
Moths described in 1910